Kakhaber (Kakha) Aladashvili (born 11 August 1983) is a professional Georgian football player.

Career
Aladashvili joined Dynamo Kyiv in March 2006 and signed on 24 December 2008 with FC Anzhi Makhachkala.

International career
Aladashvili played 2 times in UEFA Euro 2008 qualifying and is also a member of Georgian national football team.

References

External links
 Aladashvili's profile at Dynamo's official website

1983 births
Footballers from Tbilisi
Living people
Footballers from Georgia (country)
Expatriate footballers from Georgia (country)
Georgia (country) international footballers
FC Metalurgi Rustavi players
FC Sioni Bolnisi players
FC Spartaki Tbilisi players
FC Dinamo Tbilisi players
FC Kharkiv players
FC Dynamo Kyiv players
FC Dynamo-2 Kyiv players
Expatriate footballers in Ukraine
Expatriate footballers in Russia
FC Hoverla Uzhhorod players
FC Dnipro players
Ukrainian Premier League players
FC Anzhi Makhachkala players
FC Zestafoni players
FC Dila Gori players
FC SKA-Khabarovsk players
Expatriate sportspeople from Georgia (country) in Ukraine
Association football defenders